Bamra mundata is a moth of the family Noctuidae first described by Francis Walker in 1858. It is found in India (Sikkim, Assam) and Sri Lanka, Caterpillars are known to feed on Albizia  and Arachis hypogaea.

References

Moths of Asia
Moths described in 1858